Lindsey Scherf (born September 1986) is an American long-distance runner. In 2005, she set the American Junior Record for 10 km. In 2005, she set the American Junior Record for 5 km Indoor Track.

NCAA
Scherf was a three-time NCAA Division I All-American as a freshman during 2004-05. Scherf finished 18th at the 2005 IAAF World Cross Country Junior Championships in France, which was the second-best finish by an American woman under-20 since 1992. She was suspended from competition in 2007 due to refusal to take a drug test after receiving inadequate guidance from the US Anti-Doping Agency in processing her Therapeutic Use Exemption application for her physician prescribed Asthma medication.The 2007 Court of Arbitration for Sport hearing, WADA v/ USADA & Scherf, concluded in passage 9.13 of the hearing's written report that "The Panel finds that exceptional circumstances did exist in this case, and agrees that Ms. Scherf bears No Significant Fault of Negligence, because her fault or negligence, when viewed in light of all of the circumstances was not significant in relation to her anti-doping rule violation."

Professional
Scherf placed sixth at the 2005 US Cross Country Championships to earn a spot on the US Junior Cross Country Team and she finished 18th at the 2005 IAAF World Cross Country Junior Championships in France, which was the second-best finish by an American woman under-20 since 1992.

In 2009 Scherf competed at the 2009 IAAF World Cross Country Championships – Senior women's race.

In 2015, she won the Fifth Third River Bank Run (functioning as the US 25 km championships).

Scherf placed second on USATF's USA Road Circuit in 2016 after a seventh place finishes in road 5 km championships. On December 11, 2016, Scherf placed second in 2:34:05 at the 2016 Honolulu Marathon.

Scherf broke the indoor marathon world record at the 2018 Armory NYC Indoor Marathon World Record Challenge Presented by NYRR with 2:40:55.

References

1986 births
Living people
American female long-distance runners
Harvard University alumni
University of Michigan alumni
21st-century American women